Yoshino Mabuchi (馬淵 よしの, born February 2, 1966) is a retired Japanese diver who won bronze medals in the 3 m springboard and 10 platform events at the 1982 Asian Games. She placed ninth in the platform at the 1984 Summer Olympics and could not compete at the 1980 Moscow Games due to their boycott by Japan. Her parents Kanoko Tsutani-Mabuchi and Ryo Mabuchi were also Olympic divers.

Mabuchi won five national titles in diving. After retiring from competitions she ran a restaurant in Kobe, worked as TV personality, and served as a diving referee.

References

1966 births
Living people
Olympic divers of Japan
Divers at the 1984 Summer Olympics
Japanese female divers
Asian Games medalists in diving
Divers at the 1982 Asian Games
Asian Games bronze medalists for Japan
Medalists at the 1982 Asian Games
20th-century Japanese women